Evina Westbrook (born September 28, 1998) is an American professional basketball player for the Washington Mystics of the Women's National Basketball Association (WNBA). She played college basketball at UConn and Tennessee. She was selected in the 2nd Round of the 2022 WNBA Draft by the Seattle Storm.

College career

Tennessee
Westbrook came out of high school in 2017 as the #2 overall recruit according to ESPN HoopGurlz. That year she received the Morgan Wootten Player of the Year. Westbrook chose to continue her basketball career at Tennessee.

During her freshman season, Westbrook averaged 8.4 points, 4.3 assists, and 2.8 rebounds, while also starting every game. Her assist average was the second most by a Volunteer freshman. She recorded 12 assists in a game vs. Troy, which placed her 7th in the Tennessee record books and also tied a freshman record. Westbrook was named to the SEC All-Freshman Team.

During her sophomore season, Westbrook was named to the SEC Preseason Coaches All-SEC Second Team, Women's Citizens Naismith Trophy Preseason Watch List, and Nancy Lieberman Award Preseason Watch List. Westbrook averaged 14.9 points and 5.3 assists during the year.

Following the season, Westbrook announced that she would enter the transfer portal. She announced that she would be transferring to Connecticut.

Connecticut
Westbrook sat out the 2019–20 season due to the NCAA transfer rules. While sitting out, she underwent left knee surgery.

During her redshirt junior season, Westbrook started in all 30 games. She averaged 9.4 points, 5.3 rebounds, and 4.3 assists. She scored a season-high 17 points against Villanova on December 22, 2020. Following the season, Westbrook announced on Instagram that she had "unfinished business" and that she was going to be returning to UConn instead of entering the 2021 WNBA Draft.

In her final season, Westbrook bounced in and out of the starting lineup. She stayed consistent in her stats, averaging 9.0 points and 3.1 assists. She helped the Huskies to another Big East title and was named to the All-Tournament team. Westbrook also helped guide the Huskies back to another Final Four. She scored 12 points against Stanford in the semi-finals. 

After UConn lost the National Championship game, Westbrook announced that she would be entering the 2022 WNBA Draft.

College statistics

Professional career

Seattle Storm
Westbrook was selected 21st overall in the 2nd Round of the 2022 WNBA Draft by the Seattle Storm. She competed in their training camp but was waived and did not make their 2022 Opening Night roster.

Minnesota Lynx
Westbrook signed a hardship contract with the Minnesota Lynx on May 12, 2022. Westbrook's deal with the Lynx changed to a regular contract one day after originally signing the hardship contract.wnba She scored 5 points on 3 different times for the Lynx and had a high of 5 assists on May 14, 2022, against the Chicago Sky. On June 24, 2022, Westbrook was waived from the Lynx after playing in 14 games with the team.

Washington Mystics
On June 27, 2022, Westbrook signed with the Mystics.

WNBA career statistics

Regular Season

|-
| align="left" | 2022
| align="left" | Minnesota
| 14 || 2 || 12.4 || .318 || .143 || .667 || 1.4 || 1.4 || 0.4 || 0.4 || 0.9 || 2.6
|-
| align="left" | 2022
| align="left" | Washington
| 6 || 0 || 5.3 || .667 || .500 || .833 || 0.0 || 0.5 || 0.3 || 0.2 || 0.5 || 3.3
|-
| align="left" | Career
| align="left" | 1 year, 2 teams
| 20 || 2 || 10.3 || .377 || .250 || .733 || 1.0 || 1.2 || 0.4 || 0.4 || 0.8 || 2.8

References

External links
WNBA bio
UConn bio
Tennessee bio

1998 births
Living people
American women's basketball players
Basketball players from Oregon
Guards (basketball)
Tennessee Lady Volunteers basketball players
UConn Huskies women's basketball players
Seattle Storm draft picks
Minnesota Lynx players
Sportspeople from Salem, Oregon